Barycypraea is a genus of sea snails, marine gastropod mollusks in the family Cypraeidae, the cowries.

Species
Species within the genus Barycypraea include:
† Barycypraea caputviperae Martin, 1899 
Barycypraea fultoni (Sowerby III, 1903)
Barycypraea teulerei (Cazanavette, B., 1846)  (synonyms : Cypraea leucostoma Gaskoin, J.S., 1843 ; Cypraea hidalgoi Shaw, H.O.N., 1909) : synonym of Bernaya teulerei (Cazenavette, 1846)

References

Cypraeidae